"The Coast of Colorado" is a song co-written and recorded by American country music artist Skip Ewing.  It was released in June 1989 as the fifth single and title track from the album The Coast of Colorado.  The song reached #15 on the Billboard Hot Country Singles & Tracks chart.  Ewing wrote the song with Max D. Barnes.

Chart performance

References

1989 singles
Skip Ewing songs
Songs written by Max D. Barnes
Songs written by Skip Ewing
Song recordings produced by Jimmy Bowen
MCA Records singles
1988 songs